Memento Mori  is the second studio album from American alternative metal band Gemini Syndrome.  Released on August 19, 2016, the work was published by Another Century Records.

Track listing

Charts

References 

2016 albums
Gemini Syndrome albums
Albums produced by Kevin Churko
Another Century Records albums